The sixteenth series of the British semi-reality television programme The Only Way Is Essex was confirmed on 3 June 2015 when it was announced that it had renewed for at least a further six series, taking it up to 21 series. It is therefore the first series to be included in its current contract. The series launched on 4 October 2015 with two Marbella specials. After the launch of the new series, it was immediately followed by another one-off special "TOWIE: All Back to Essex", hosted by Mark Wright. Ahead of the series it was announced that cast member Gemma Collins had quit the show having appeared since the second series, however she later returned for the Essexmas special. This was also the final series to feature original cast member Lauren Pope, who quit mid-way through the series, Jess Wright and Ferne McCann who both announced their departures from the show ahead of the seventeenth series. This was also the final series to include Patricia "Nanny Pat" Brooker following her death. A Christmas special of the show aired on 16 December 2015 which featured the brief return of former cast members Gemma Collins, Lauren Goodger and Mario Falcone.

Cast

Episodes

{| class="wikitable plainrowheaders" style="width:100%; background:#fff;"
! style="background:#DA5FFF;"| Seriesno.
! style="background:#DA5FFF;"| Episodeno.
! style="background:#DA5FFF;"| Title
! style="background:#DA5FFF;"| Original air date
! style="background:#DA5FFF;"| Duration
! style="background:#DA5FFF;"| UK viewers

|}

Reception

Ratings

References

The Only Way Is Essex
2015 British television seasons